Edo Ronchi (born 31 May 1950) is an Italian engineer and politician. He served as minister of environment and protection of land and sea from 1996 to 2000 in three different cabinets. He was the first Green politician to hold a cabinet post in Italy.

Early life and education
Ronchi was born in Treviglio on 31 May 1950. He holds an electrical engineering degree from the Politecnico di Milano.

Career and activities
Ronchi had a revolutionary communist political leaning. Later he became a member of the Federation of the Greens. He joined the party in 1983 and became a member of its steering committee in 1989. He was elected to the Italian Parliament in 1983. In 1989 he was elected to the European Parliament, but resigned from office after serving in the post just for one month to concentrate on his initiative, namely Rainbow Greens, which he had cofounded with Francesco Rutelli earlier in 1989. In 1992 Ronchi became senator and was the leader of the Federation of the Greens in the Italian Senate.

He was named minister of environment on 17 May 1996 to the  cabinet headed by Prime Minister Romano Prodi. Ronchi became the first member of the party who assumed a cabinet post in the country.

After serving in the post in the first cabinet of Prime Minister Massimo D'Alema on 21 December 1999 Ronchi was reappointed minister of environment to the second cabinet of D'Alema. His tenure ended on 19 April 2000 when the cabinet resigned, and Giuliano Amato formed the cabinet. Ronchi was offered by Prime Minister Amato the post of minister of European affairs, but he did not accept the post due to his intention of serving as minister of environment. However, Ronchi's proposal was not endorsed, and Willer Bordon replaced him as minister of environment. When Ronchi was in office as environment minister Italy signed the Kyoto Protocol in 1997.

After leaving public office, Ronchi began to work at the Sustainable Development Foundation, and as of 2013 he was on the national advisory board of Ecomondo, an initiative for green movement.

References

External links

20th-century Italian engineers
21st-century Italian engineers
1950 births
Democrats of the Left politicians
Democratic Party (Italy) politicians
Deputies of Legislature IX of Italy
Deputies of Legislature X of Italy
Deputies of Legislature XI of Italy
Federation of the Greens MEPs
Federation of the Greens politicians
Living people
People from Treviglio
Politicians of Lombardy
Polytechnic University of Milan alumni
Proletarian Democracy politicians
Rainbow Greens politicians
Senators of Legislature XII of Italy
Senators of Legislature XIII of Italy
Senators of Legislature XV of Italy
Italian electrical engineers
Environment ministers of Italy